Acicula palaestinensis is a species of very small land snail with an operculum, a terrestrial gastropod mollusk in the family Aciculidae.

This species is endemic to Israel.

References

Acicula (gastropod)
Gastropods described in 1981
Taxonomy articles created by Polbot